Charalambides (also spelled Charalambidis or Charalampidis) is a Greek surname. It may refer to:

Constantinos Charalambidis (born 1981), Cypriot footballer
Kostas Charalampidis (born 1976), Greek basketball player
Kyriakos Charalambides (born 1940), Greek poet and translator
Stephanos of Tallinn (born as Christakis Charalambides, 1940), Estonian Orthodox Church primate
Nora in Dashiel Hammett's 1934 book The Thin Man teasingly calls her detective husband Nick Charles "Mr. Charalambides".  The reference, predating any of the above, is as mysterious as it is unknown.